Lee Charles Francis (born 24 October 1969) is an English former footballer who played the Football League for Chesterfield.

References

1969 births
Living people
English footballers
Association football defenders
English Football League players
People from Walthamstow
Arsenal F.C. players
Chesterfield F.C. players
Enfield F.C. players
Boreham Wood F.C. players
Grays Athletic F.C. players
Yeovil Town F.C. players
Hendon F.C. players
Billericay Town F.C. players
Hertford Town F.C. players